Moez Echargui and Skander Mansouri were the defending champions but chose not to defend their title.

Victor Vlad Cornea and Ruben Gonzales won the title after defeating Tomoya Fujiwara and Masamichi Imamura 7–5, 6–3 in the final.

Seeds

Draw

References

External links
 Main draw

Keio Challenger - Men's doubles
2022 Men's doubles